Chamaesphacos is a genus of plants in the family Lamiaceae, first described in 1841. It contains only one known species, Chamaesphacos ilicifolius, native to Central Asia (Iran, Afghanistan, Kazakhstan, Uzbekistan, Turkmenistan, Tajikistan, Xinjiang).

References

Lamiaceae
Flora of Central Asia
Monotypic Lamiaceae genera